The 1928 South Australian National Football League season was the 49th season of the top-level Australian rules football competition in South Australia.

Ladder

Finals series

Grand Final

References

SANFL
South Australian National Football League seasons